Basiprionota decempustulata is a species of beetle belonging to the family Chrysomelidae. This species occurs in Indonesia. Host plants include  Clerodendrum species (Verbenaceae).

References
 Biolib
 Biol.uni

Cassidinae
Insects of Indonesia
Beetles described in 1850